Union Sportive Laonnaise is a French association football team founded in 1947. They are based in Laon, France and are currently playing in the Championnat de France Amateurs 2 Group A, the fifth tier in the French football league system. They play at the Stade Marcel Levindrey in Laon.

Football clubs in France
Association football clubs established in 1947
1947 establishments in France
Sport in Aisne
Laon
Football clubs in Hauts-de-France